Paradise Express is a 1937 American film directed by Joseph Kane.

Plot summary 
The Moon Valley Railroad is losing money to the Armstrong Trucking Company, which is owned by gangsters. When the railroad goes into receivership, it is forced to lay off several people. The president of the railroad, Jed Carson, has acquired a hatred for the new receiver, Lawrence 'Larry' Doyle. His granddaughter, Kay Carson, also does not like Doyle. After getting himself acquainted with both Jed Carson and Kay Carson, Doyle goes and wins back some business. Kay starts to take a liking to Doyle, but her grandfather still hates him. When the new customer's freight is damaged, Doyle knows it is the Armstrong Trucking Company. After talking to Doyle, it is revealed that the owner of Armstrong Trucking, Mr. Armstrong, had Doyle appointed as the receiver, thinking it would benefit him. However, Doyle has no plans to help the Armstrong Trucking Company. Now that the railroad has won some business back, it must work on its speed, to attract more business. Doyle asks a former railroad employee to run a fast freight to beat the trucking company's schedule. When the train is mysteriously wrecked, the town blames Doyle. However, Jed Carson does research and finds that the wreck was not Doyle's fault, and reveals it to the people of the town. Before the wreck occurred, the train beat the trucking company's schedule. When the trucking company challenges the railroad to a race for a contract, the railroad starts to win, but when the train stops for water, they find out that the water tower has been vandalized by the trucking Company. Without water for the tender, the locomotive cannot run, However, Doyle thinks up the idea to cut up the ice in the refrigerator cars, and pass it to the tender. Soon, the locomotive Is running, and after a Close call at a railroad crossing, the Train rolls into paradise. Armstrong and his henchmen are convicted when one of the trucking company's employees writes a confession. The film ends with Kay embracing Doyle, for she has fallen for him.

Cast 
Grant Withers as Lawrence 'Larry' Doyle
Dorothy Appleby as Kay Carson
Arthur Hoyt as Phineas K. Trotter
Maude Eburne as Maggie Casey
Harry Davenport as Jed Carson
Donald Kirke as Armstrong
Arthur Loft as Glover
Lew Kelly as Tom Wilson
Anthony Pawley as Stymie
Fern Emmett as Landlady
John Holland as Gus
Robert McClung as Harmonica Player
Bruce Mitchell as Train Conductor
Guy Wilkerson as Skinny Smith
George Cleveland as Farmer Beasley
Ralph McCullough as Dispatcher
William L. Thorne as Farmer at meeting

Soundtrack

External links 

1937 films
1937 drama films
American black-and-white films
Republic Pictures films
American drama films
Films produced by Nat Levine
Films directed by Joseph Kane
1930s English-language films
1930s American films